Lottiidibacillus  is a genus of bacteria from the family of Bacillaceae with one known species (Lottiidibacillus patelloidae). Lottiidibacillus patelloidae has been isolated  from a sea snail (Patelloida saccharina lanx) from Xiamen.

References

Bacillaceae
Bacteria genera
Monotypic bacteria genera
Bacteria described in 2020